Noam Gottesman (born May 1961) is a New York City-based, British-American businessman, former hedge fund manager, and co-founder of GLG Partners. He later entered the restaurant industry, investing in establishments including Eleven Madison Park in New York City. He is also the CEO of TOMS Capital. Gottesman has dual citizenship in the US and UK, and was listed on the 2020 Forbes 400 list of richest people in the United States, with a net worth of $2.4 billion.

Early life and education
Gottesman was born in May 1961, to a Jewish family, the son of Israel Museum president Dov Gottesman. He received a BA from Columbia University in 1986.

Career
Gottesman worked at the Goldman Sachs London office and became its executive director while managing global equity portfolios for their private client group. He left Goldman Sachs in 1995 with Pierre Lagrange and Jonathan Green to co-found GLG Partners. The company went on to manage $24.6 billion and become a publicly traded entity on the New York Stock Exchange (November 2007) and had up to $24.6 billion in assets under management. Gottesman and his partners sold the company to the Man Group in October 2010 for $1.6 billion. Gottesman continued to serve as GLG's co-CEO until January 2012, when he became the non-executive chairman for GLG's business in the US. Gottesman is the CEO of the investment company TOMS Capital.

Philanthropy
He is a trustee at his alma mater Columbia University and as board member at the Tate Gallery Foundation. Gottesman is on the Chairman's Council of the Metropolitan Museum of Art, and the international council of the Museum of Modern Art. He has sat on the board of trustees of New York-Presbyterian Hospital of since 2017  Other activities include ownership of the restaurants Eleven Madison Park, which has been voted the number 1 restaurant in the world by The World's 50 Best Restaurants magazine publication, and Shuko, which New York Magazine voted the "Best Sushi in New York". He also owns Nomad, and the eponymous investment vehicle also named "Nomad" that he cofounded, which purchased Iglo Group, purveyor of Birds Eye Frozen Products.

Personal life 
Gottesman married Geraldine Gottesman and had four children. They later divorced.

Gottesman comes from a family of art collectors, and is among the 200 most notable collectors according to ARTnews. He owns pieces by Francis Bacon and Lucian Freud and Andy Warhol.

In 2014, he was dating the actress Lucy Liu. In 2015, Gottesman married Bianca Dueñas, director of sales for fashion designer Reed Krakoff.

In July 2019, Gottesman was accused of illegally carving out a personal driveway in front of his Greenwich Village townhouse. The accusations were first reported on the front page of the New York Daily News.

References

Living people
American art collectors
American billionaires
American expatriates in the United Kingdom
American financiers
American financial company founders
American hedge fund managers
American money managers
Businesspeople from New York City
British Jews
British billionaires
British financiers
Columbia College (New York) alumni
Columbia University people
Goldman Sachs people
Israeli art collectors
Israeli billionaires
Israeli emigrants to the United States
Israeli expatriates in the United Kingdom
Israeli financiers
Israeli hedge fund managers
Israeli Jews
Israeli money managers
Jewish art collectors
1961 births